Chicoreus lorenzi is a species of sea snail, a marine gastropod mollusk in the family Muricidae, the murex snails or rock snails.

Description
The length of the shell attains 47.4 mm.

Distribution
This marine species occurs off French Polynesia.

References

 Houart R. (2009). Description of Chicoreus (Triplex) lorenzi n.sp. (Gastropoda: Muricidae) from the Marquesas Archipelago. Novapex 10(4): 173–176.

Muricidae
Gastropods described in 2009